Heart of Atlanta may refer to:
 The original business district of Atlanta, now part of South Downtown 
 Heart of Atlanta Motel v. United States, a trial